James Cerretani and Philipp Oswald were the defending champions but only Cerretani chose to defend his title, partnering Max Schnur. Cerretani lost in the first round to Sander Arends and Matwé Middelkoop.

Julian Knowle and Igor Zelenay won the title after defeating Kevin Krawietz and Gero Kretschmer 6–3, 7–6(7–3) in the final.

Seeds

Draw

References

External links
 Main draw

Sparkassen Open - Doubles
2017 Doubles